The SNK Union of Independents (Czech official title: SNK sdružení nezávislých), or SNK (from the earlier title Sdružení nezávislých kandidátů - Association of Independent Candidates), was a small (rather conservative and liberal) political party (registered as a movement - hnutí by the Czech legislative) in Czech Republic, led since May 2007 by Helmut Dohnálek.

It was founded in 2000 in order to help various non-party affiliated town mayors to take part in regional assembly elections. Later it won two seats in the Senate elections in 2002.

In the 2004 European Parliament Election it stood on a joint ticket with the European Democrats which gained 11% of the vote and elected three MEPs, two of whom are members of the SNK.

In February 2006 the non-parliamentary parties SNK and "European Democrats (ED)" merged. The unified party, led by former Foreign Minister Josef Zieleniec, is called "SNK European Democrats (SNK ED)". The pro-European and liberal-conservative SNK-ED is represented by three deputies in the European Parliament.

Election results
2002 Chamber of Deputies: 2,78% - no seat
2002 Senate: SNK - 2 seats
2004 Senate: SNK - 1 seat
2004 European Parliament: in coalition with ED - 11,02% - 3 seats

See also
List of political parties in the Czech Republic
SNK European Democrats

References

Conservative parties in the Czech Republic
Liberal parties in the Czech Republic